Ishkildino (İşkilde) is a rural locality (a village) in Burangulovsky Selsoviet, Abzelilovsky District, Bashkortostan, Russia. The population was 234 as of 2010. There are 7 streets.

Geography 
Ishkildino is located 34 km northwest of Askarovo (the district's administrative centre) by road. Saitkulovo is the nearest rural locality.

References 

Rural localities in Abzelilovsky District